Railways:
0 km

Highways:
total:

paved:

unpaved:
 (1996 est.)

Ports and harbors:
Colonia (Yap), Kolonia (Pohnpei), Lele, Moen

Merchant marine:
total: three ships (1,000 GT or over) 3,560 GT/ 
by type: cargo one, passenger/cargo two (2007) 

Airports:
Six (2007)

Airports - with paved runways:
total:
Six
1,524 to 2,437 m:
Four (Chuuk International Airport, Kosrae International Airport, Pohnpei International Airport and Yap International Airport)
914 to 1,523 m:
Two (2007)

See also
Federated States of Micronesia
List of airports in the Federated States of Micronesia